Bokane is a village in Croatia, in the municipality of Voćin, Virovitica-Podravina County. It is connected by the D69 highway.

Demographics
According to the 2011 census, the village of Bokane has 215 inhabitants. This represents 185.34% of its pre-war population according to the 1991 census.

The 1991 census recorded that 94.83% of the village population were ethnic Serbs (110/116), 2.59% were Yugoslavs (3/116), 1.72% were ethnic Croats (2/116),  and 0.86% were of other ethnic origin (1/116).

From 1992 on, Janjevci Croats from Kosovo were settled in Bokane.

References

Populated places in Virovitica-Podravina County
Serb communities in Croatia